The 1985 Women's Davies & Tate British Open Squash Championships was held at East Grinstead, West Sussex with the later stages being held at the Wembley Conference Centre in London from 15–23 April 1985. The event was won for the second consecutive year by Susan Devoy who defeated Martine Le Moignan in the final.

Seeds

Draw and results

First round

Second round

Third round

Quarter-finals

Semi-finals

Final

References

Women's British Open Squash Championships
Women's British Open Squash Championship
Women's British Open Squash Championship
Squash competitions in London
Women's British Open Squash Championship, 1985
Women's British Open Squash Championship, 1985
Women's British Open Squash Championship
British Open Squash Championship